Penrod and Sam is a 1937 drama film directed by William C. McGann and written by Lillie Hayward and Hugh Cummings. It was the third screen version of American writer Booth Tarkington's novel Penrod and Sam. The film stars Billy Mauch, Frank Craven, Spring Byington, Craig Reynolds, Harry Watson and Jackie Morrow. The film was released by Warner Bros. on February 28, 1937.

Plot
Penrod Schofield and his gang are the Jr. G Men, a secret club where all members are sworn to uphold the law and turn in crooks. When the mother of the youngest member is killed by bank robbers, the boys go into action.

Cast
Billy Mauch as Penrod
Frank Craven as Mr. Schofield
Spring Byington as Mrs. Schofield
Craig Reynolds as Roy 'Dude' Hanson
Harry Watson as Sam
Jackie Morrow as Rodney Bitts
Philip Hurlic as Verman Diggs 
Charles Halton as Mr. Rodney H. Bitts
Bernice Pilot as Delia
Kenneth Harlan as Real G-Man

References

External links

1937 films
American black-and-white films
Films directed by William C. McGann
Films based on American novels
Films based on works by Booth Tarkington
1937 comedy-drama films
American comedy-drama films
Warner Bros. films
1930s English-language films
1930s American films